Polino is a comune (municipality) in the Province of Terni in the Italian region Umbria, located about 70 km southeast of Perugia and about 15 km east of Terni. As of 31 December 2004, it had a population of 275 and an area of 19.5 km2.

Polino borders the following municipalities: Arrone, Ferentillo, Leonessa, Morro Reatino, Rivodutri.

Demographic evolution

References

Cities and towns in Umbria